The Monti Lepini (Italian: Lepini mountains) are a mountain range which belongs to the Anti-Apennines of the Lazio region of central Italy, between the two provinces of Latina and Rome.

The range borders to the north with the Colli Albani, to the south-east with the Amaseno Valley, to the south with the Monti Ausoni and to the west with the Pontinian Plain. The highest peak is the Monte Semprevisa (1,536 m).

The name derives probably from the Latin lapis (stone), referring to the mountains’ limestone rocks. In ancient times the area was settled by the Volsci.

The most striking natural feature is the Gardens of Ninfa. There are also numerous grottoes, including some of the most significant in central Italy. The wildlife of the mountains includes peregrine falcons, griffons and Apennine wolves.

References

Mountain ranges of the Apennines
Mountain ranges of Italy
Mountains of Lazio